Secrets Are Sinister is the fourth studio album by American indie rock band Longwave. It was released on November 11, 2008 on Original Signal Recordings.

Track listing 
"Sirens in the Deep Sea" – 3:59
"No Direction" – 4:15
"Satellites" – 3:34
"The Devil and the Liar" – 4:44
"Life Is Wrong" – 4:40
"Eyes Like Headlights" – 3:45
"I Don't Dare" – 3:36
"It's True" – 3:48
"Shining Hours" – 3:44
"Secrets Are Sinister" – 3:17
"Sideways Sideways Rain" (Japanese bonus track) – 4:12

Longwave (band) albums
2008 albums